The 36th Battalion, CEF, was an infantry battalion of the Canadian Expeditionary Force.

History 
The battalion was
authorized on 7 November 1914, and recruited in Hamilton, Ontario and the surrounding district. The 36th Battalion embarked for Britain on 19 June 1915, where it provided reinforcements to the Canadian Corps in the field until 4 January 1917, when its personnel were absorbed by the 3rd Reserve Battalion, CEF. The battalion was disbanded on 15 September 1917.

The 36th Battalion, CEF, had three Officers Commanding:
Lt.-Col. E.C. Ashton, 16 August 1915 – 15 September 1915
Maj. A.N. Ashton, 15 September 1915 – 24 April 1916
Lt.-Col. W.S. Buell, 24 April 1916 – 2 January 1917

Battle Honours 
The 36th Battalion was awarded the battle honour THE GREAT WAR 1915-17.

Perpetuation 
In 1920, the perpetuation of the 36th Battalion, CEF was first assigned to The Dufferin Rifles of Canada, and is now held by the 56th Field Artillery Regiment, RCA.

 The Dufferin Rifles of Canada (1920-1936)
 The Dufferin and Haldimand Rifles of Canada (1936-1946)
 56th Field Artillery Regiment, RCA (1946–Present)

See also 

 List of infantry battalions in the Canadian Expeditionary Force

References

External links

Military units and formations of Ontario
036